Radamés González Tamayo (born February 4, 1956) is a former Cuban marathon runner. He won the gold medal at the 1979 Pan American Games and competed for his native country at the 1980 Summer Olympics.

References
 sports-reference

1956 births
Living people
Cuban male marathon runners
Olympic athletes of Cuba
Athletes (track and field) at the 1980 Summer Olympics
Athletes (track and field) at the 1979 Pan American Games
Athletes (track and field) at the 1983 Pan American Games
Athletes (track and field) at the 1991 Pan American Games
Pan American Games gold medalists for Cuba
Pan American Games bronze medalists for Cuba
Pan American Games medalists in athletics (track and field)
Central American and Caribbean Games silver medalists for Cuba
Competitors at the 1982 Central American and Caribbean Games
Competitors at the 1986 Central American and Caribbean Games
Central American and Caribbean Games medalists in athletics
Medalists at the 1979 Pan American Games
Medalists at the 1991 Pan American Games
20th-century Cuban people
21st-century Cuban people